The Lynn Tigers were a minor league baseball team based in Lynn, Massachusetts, that existed for only one season, 1949. They played in the New England League and were affiliated with the Detroit Tigers. Under managers Thomas Kennedy and Charles Webb, they went 29–47 in their only year of existence; they withdrew from the league on July 19.

See also
Lynn Red Sox

References

External links
 1949 Lynn Tigers at Baseball-Reference.com

1949 disestablishments in Massachusetts
1949 establishments in Massachusetts
Baseball teams disestablished in 1949
Baseball teams established in 1949
Defunct baseball teams in Massachusetts
Defunct minor league baseball teams
Sports in Lynn, Massachusetts